The following is a list of football stadiums in South Korea, ordered by capacity. All stadiums with a seating capacity of 10,000 or more are included.

See also 
 List of Asian stadiums by capacity
 List of association football stadiums by capacity
 List of sports venues in South Korea
 List of baseball stadiums in South Korea

References
 Stadiums in South Korea - World Stadiums

Stadiums
Football stadiums
South Korea